Rainer Kraft (born 8 January 1974) is a German politician for the Alternative for Germany (AfD) and since 2017 member of the Bundestag.

Life and politics
Kraft was born 1974 in the West German town of Gräfelfing and studied chemistry and reached his PhD in 2002.
Kraft entered the newly founded populist AfD in 2013 and became after the 2017 German federal election a member of the Bundestag. Kraft is considered to be part of the right-wing factional cluster Der Flügel (the wing).

Kraft denies the scientific consensus on climate change.

References

1974 births
Members of the Bundestag for Bavaria
Living people
People from Munich (district)
Members of the Bundestag 2021–2025
Members of the Bundestag 2017–2021
Members of the Bundestag for the Alternative for Germany
21st-century German chemists
Ludwig Maximilian University of Munich alumni